Clonmel was a constituency represented in the Irish House of Commons until its abolition on 1 January 1801.

History
In the Patriot Parliament of 1689 summoned by James II, Clonmel was represented with two members.

Members of Parliament
1560: Henry White and John Strich
1585: Geoffrey White and John Bray
1613–1615: Nicholas White and John Bray
1634–1635: Geoffrey Barron (expelled 1634) and Henry fitz Nicholas White
1639–1649: William Smythe and Richard Gethin
1661–1666: Sir Thomas Stanley of Tickincorr (sat for Co Louth, Replaced 1661 by Sir James Shane) and Sir Francis Foulke

1689–1801

Notes

References

Bibliography

Constituencies of the Parliament of Ireland (pre-1801)
Clonmel
Historic constituencies in County Tipperary
1800 disestablishments in Ireland
Constituencies disestablished in 1800